Patricia A Page married name Patricia Havers (born 1939) is a former English badminton international player and former Scottish Open doubles champion.

Biography
Page won the 1964 Scottish Open mixed doubles title with Tony Jordan and was the 1967 mixed doubles runner-up with her brother-in-law John Havers in the English National Badminton Championships.

In 1965 she married Bill Havers the 1964 English national champion.

References 

English female badminton players
1939 births
Living people